Tashi Tsering may refer to:
(born 1929), Tibetan educator, editor of an English-Chinese-Tibetan dictionary.
Tashi Tsering (Australian Geshe), Tibetan Buddhist teacher, (born 1937), now residing in Australia and India
Tashi Tsering (tibetologist) (born 1960), tibetologist, founder of Amnye Machen Institut, Dharamsala, India
Tashi Tsering (Jamyang Buddhist Centre), Tibetan Buddhist teacher, (born 1958), formerly residing in England, abbot of Sera Mey Monastic University
Tashi Tsering (footballer), Tibetan and Nepalese footballer